Arbanats is a commune of the Gironde department in southwestern France. Arbanats station has rail connections to Langon and Bordeaux.

Population

See also
Communes of the Gironde department

References

Communes of Gironde